I Was An American Spy is a 1951 American war drama film dramatizing the true story of Claire Phillips, an American of Filipino descent who spied on the Japanese during World War II and was captured, tortured, and sentenced to death before being rescued. The film, produced by Allied Artists and directed by Lesley Selander, starred Ann Dvorak in the title role. In addition to obtaining the rights to her 1947 book Manila Espionage, the filmmakers brought Phillips on as a technical adviser and she made personal appearances to promote the film,  Phillips and Dvorak became good friends, with Phillips admiring Dvorak's professional dedication in this difficult role. The film begins with  General Mark W. Clark paying tribute to Claire Phillips and ends with General Clark awarding her the Medal of Freedom.

Plot

Claire, an American-born Filipina living in Manila, is working as a cafe entertainer on the eve of the attack on Pearl Harbor. She marries an American soldier, Sgt. John Phillips (Douglas Kennedy), and with her husband, witnesses the Japanese invasion of the Philippines during the siege of Bataan. Her husband is captured, and she watches as he is killed by machine gun fire in the Bataan Death March after he defies the order of a cruel Japanese soldier not to drink from typhoid contaminated water. In retaliation, Phillips uses a handgun to shoot and kill a Japanese soldier. She then joins the anti-Japanese resistance, and in order to obtain intelligence to send back to the United States, she opens a nightclub catering to Japanese officers. Phillips is code named "High Pockets" for her habit of stashing items in her brassiere. She successfully passes useful intelligence on to the American forces and the Filipino underground, but is then discovered, imprisoned, and water tortured by the Japanese. Sentenced to death, she is rescued in the nick of time by American soldiers (one of whom is Cpl. John Boone (Gene Evans)) who storm Bilibid Prison, killing the Japanese guards.

Cast
 Ann Dvorak as Claire "High Pockets" Phillips
 Gene Evans as Cpl. John Boone
 Douglas Kennedy as Sgt. John Phillips
 Richard Loo as Col. Masanoto
 Leon Lontok as Pacio
 Chabin as Lolita
 Philip Ahn as Capt. Arito
 Lisa Ferraday as Dorothy Fuentes
 Riley Hill as Thompson

Reception
Unfortunately The New York Times critic wrote that it "isn't especially stimulating either as a narrative or as a tribute to personal courage." On the other hand, Hal Erickson noted in AllMovie that the film "handles its more brutal scenes with a marked degree of tastefulness".

References

External links
 
 

1951 films
American spy films
American war films
Spy films based on actual events
Films based on non-fiction books
Films set in the Philippines
Japanese occupation of the Philippines films
Japan in non-Japanese culture
Allied Artists films
Pacific War films
World War II spy films
1950s war films
American black-and-white films
1950s English-language films
Films directed by Lesley Selander
1950s American films